James Cartwright-Garland (born 16 June 1976 in North Vancouver, British Columbia) is a Canadian slalom canoeist who competed from the mid-1990s to the late 2000s. Competing in three Summer Olympics, he earned his best finish of ninth in the C1 event in Athens in 2004.

World Cup individual podiums

1 Pan American Championship counting for World Cup points

References

James Cartwright on Real Champions

1976 births
Canadian male canoeists
Canoeists at the 2000 Summer Olympics
Canoeists at the 2004 Summer Olympics
Canoeists at the 2008 Summer Olympics
Living people
Olympic canoeists of Canada
Sportspeople from North Vancouver
Sportspeople from British Columbia
University of Ottawa alumni